Daniel Model (born 1960) is a Swiss curler and businessperson.

Teams

References

External links
 
 
 MODEL HOLDING AG | Model Group
 
 Daniel Model in who-s-who.ch
 Daniel Model – Author – Schweizer Monat

Living people
Swiss male curlers
Swiss curling champions
Swiss businesspeople
Date of birth missing (living people)
Place of birth missing (living people)
1960 births